"How Can You Mend a Broken Heart" is a song released by the Bee Gees in 1971. It was written by Barry and Robin Gibb and was the first single on the group's 1971 album Trafalgar. It was their first US No. 1 single and also reached No. 1 in Cashbox magazine for two weeks.

In the US Atco Records issued both mono and stereo versions of the song on each side as a promo single. The B-side was a Maurice Gibb composition "Country Woman".

The song appears in the 2013 film American Hustle and on its soundtrack. It also provided the title to director Frank Marshall's 2020 documentary film The Bee Gees: How Can You Mend a Broken Heart.

Writing and recording
Barry and Robin Gibb wrote the song in August 1970 with "Lonely Days" when the Gibb brothers had reconvened following a period of break-up and alienation. "Robin came to my place," says Barry, "and that afternoon we wrote 'How Can You Mend a Broken Heart' and that obviously was a link to us coming back together. We called Maurice, finished the song, went to the studio and once again, with only 'Broken Heart' as a basic structure, we went in to the studio with that and an idea for 'Lonely Days', and those two songs were recorded that night". They originally offered the song to Andy Williams, but ended up recording it themselves, although Williams did later cover the song on his album You've Got a Friend. Barry also explains, "We might imitate a certain group, later on, the group will pick up on the song and say that suits us." Maurice Gibb possibly had a hand in the writing of "How Can You Mend A Broken Heart" although the song is officially credited to Barry and Robin Gibb. The 2009 release Ultimate Bee Gees officially credited Maurice for the first time as co-writer of the song, for both the "Ultimate"  CD and DVD, and it was credited to the moniker Barry, Robin and Maurice Gibb.

The song was recorded on 28 January 1971 in London, the same day as "We Lost the Road", "When Do I", "If I Were the Sky", "Bring Out the Thoughts in Me" and "Ellan Vannin". The group's later song "My World" followed along the same musical ideas on this song. Robin Gibb's remarked on the song, "The whole thing took about an hour to complete. The song reached the number one spot, to our great satisfaction."

Reception
The song was sung live for the first time in 1971, in a performance that was notable as drummer Geoff Bridgford's first appearance with the band. Although failing to chart on the UK Singles Chart, the song became the Bee Gees' first US number one on the Billboard Hot 100 and also reached number four on the Billboard Adult Contemporary chart. Billboard ranked it as the No. 5 song for 1971.  Cash Box described the song as being "a slower, almost country-ballad styled performance which links an intricate melody segment with more powerful thrusts to give the track top forty impetus." In Spain, it was released under the title "Cómo Puedes Arreglar Un Corazón Destrozado".

Following the release of "How Can You Mend a Broken Heart", the song was nominated for a Grammy Award for Best Pop Vocal Performance by a Duo Or Group along with George Harrison's "My Sweet Lord" and others. It was performed as part of a medley on The Midnight Special on 10 October 1975, in Japan on the Japanese TV special Love Sounds, and on the Mr. Natural tour in 1974. A live version recorded on Nov 17th and 18th, 1989 at the National Tennis Centre, Melbourne, Australia was used for the benefit album Nobody's Child: Romanian Angel Appeal. In 1997-1999, the song was performed on the One Night Only tour as part of a medley. It was last performed by the Bee Gees in 2001.

Barry Gibb re-recorded the song as a duet with Sheryl Crow for his 2020 solo album Greenfields: The Gibb Brothers Songbook, Vol. 1.

Personnel
 Barry Gibb – lead and harmony vocals, acoustic guitar
 Robin Gibb – lead and harmony vocals
 Maurice Gibb – harmony vocals, bass guitar, piano, acoustic guitar, organ
 Geoff Bridgford – drums
 Bill Shepherd – orchestral and strings arrangement

Charts

Weekly charts

Year-end charts

All-time charts

Other versions
1970s
1971: Johnny Mathis recorded a version of this song for his LP You've Got a Friend.
1972: Al Green recorded the song for his album Let's Stay Together, which also appeared on the soundtracks of 1997's Good Will Hunting, 1999's The Virgin Suicides, 1999's Notting Hill and 2010's The Book of Eli. Green's version was released as a single in France on Cream Records. In 2008, Green's version was remade into a duet with Joss Stone for the soundtrack to the film adaptation of Sex and the City, with her vocals overdubbed onto the track.
1973: Singer-actress Cher covered the song on her 1973 album Half-Breed.
1977: Florence Henderson performed the song during a medley on an episode of The Brady Bunch Variety Hour.
1980s
Single release by Deirdre and Louise Rutkowski (later of 4AD supergroup This Mortal Coil) for their debut "In An Ideal World" (1984) with their first band Sunset Gun.
1990s
1991: Teddy Pendergrass recorded a version of this song on his LP Truly Blessed.
2000s
2003: Michael Bublé recorded this song, with Barry Gibb performing backup vocals, on his self-titled album. Bublé's version reached number 22 on the US Billboard Adult Contemporary chart. It was Buble's first single.
2003: American Idol's second winner Ruben Studdard covered the song on his debut album Soulful.
2005: Mari Wilson, English pop and jazz singer, included a cover on her album Dolled Up.   
2005: Steve Brookstein recorded it on his number-one album Heart and Soul.
2006: The song is covered in Julio Iglesias's album Romantic Classics.
2007: Barry Manilow's version appears on his album The Greatest Songs of the Seventies.
2009: Jazz singer-pianist Diana Krall covered this song on her album Quiet Nights.
2009: Rod Stewart recorded a version for his album Soulbook, though it was left off the final track listing.
2010s
2014: Eef Barzelay recorded a version for a fundraising CD titled More Super Hits of the Seventies for freeform radio station WFMU.
2017: Chris Stills recorded a version for the feature film I, Tonya.
2020: Kahil El'Zabar recorded an instrumental version titled "How Can We Mend Broken Heart" for his 2020 album America the Beautiful.

References

Literature
Melinda Bilyeu, Hector Cook, and Andrew Môn Hughes, with Joseph Brennan and Mark Crohan.  The Ultimate Biography of the Bee Gees.  London: Omnibus, 2001.
Unpublished list of tape reels, Universal/Polygram, viewed in 2000 by Joseph Brennan.

External links
 [ Allmusic entry]
 Superseventies.com entry
 Gibb Songs

1971 singles
1971 songs
Atco Records singles
Polydor Records singles
Songs written by Barry Gibb
Songs written by Robin Gibb
Bee Gees songs
Al Green songs
Diana Krall songs
Joss Stone songs
2003 debut singles
Michael Bublé songs
Cher songs
Andy Williams songs
Billboard Hot 100 number-one singles
Cashbox number-one singles
RPM Top Singles number-one singles
Song recordings produced by Robert Stigwood
Song recordings produced by Barry Gibb
Song recordings produced by Robin Gibb
Song recordings produced by Maurice Gibb
Songs about loneliness
Songs about heartache